The Benson Hills are a cluster of coastal hills near the head of Smith Inlet in Antarctica,  east of Berry Massif on the east side of Palmer Land. They were mapped by the United States Geological Survey in 1974, and named by the Advisory Committee on Antarctic Names for Lieutenant Arthur K. Benson, a U.S. Navy Medical Officer at Palmer Station in 1969.

References 

Hills of Palmer Land